İlhami Sancar  (1909 – 13 December 1986) was a Turkish judge, politician and former government minister.

İlhami Sancar born in Gördes ilçe (district) of Manisa Province, Ottoman Empire in 1909. He completed his primary education in Kemalpaşa, and the secondary education in İzmir. He studied in Law School of Ankara University. After graduation in 1933, he served as a judge.

Political career
He resigned from his court work, and joined the Republican People's Party (CHP). In 1949, he was elected as the chairman of CHP's İstanbul branch office. On 24 January 1961, he was appointed to the Constituent Assembly of Turkey as a CHP representative. During the post-military era, he served as a deputy of İstanbul Province in the 12th, and the   13th Parliament of Turkey between 1961 and 1969.

Following the split in his party, he broke away from CHP together with Turhan Feyzioğlu, and joined the Reliance Party (CGP). He continued as a deputy in the 14th, and the 15th Parliament of Turkey between 1969 and 1977.

Minister of National Defense
Sancar was appointed five times as the Minister of National Defense. First three of these were in the 26th,  27th, and  the 28th government of Turkey, as a member of CHP between 20 November 1961 and 20 February 1965. As a CGP member, he served in the 36th government of Turkey between 15 April 1973 and 26 January 1974, and in the 38th government of Turkey between 17 November 1974 and 31 March 1975.

He died on 13 December 1986.

References

1909 births
People from Görele
Ankara University Faculty of Law alumni
Turkish judges
Members of the Constituent Assembly of Turkey
Republican People's Party (Turkey) politicians
Republican Reliance Party politicians
Deputies of Istanbul
Members of the 12th Parliament of Turkey
Members of the 13th Parliament of Turkey
Members of the 14th Parliament of Turkey
Members of the 15th Parliament of Turkey
Members of the 26th government of Turkey
Members of the 27th government of Turkey
Members of the 28th government of Turkey
Members of the 36th government of Turkey
Members of the 38th government of Turkey
Ministers of National Defence of Turkey
1986 deaths